23rd Rhythmic Gymnastics European Championships were held in Moscow, Russia from 18 September to 24 September 2006.

Medal winners

* only competed in 3 hoops + 2 clubs final
**  only competed in 5 ribbons final

Results

Individual all-around

Group all-around

Group 5 ribbons

Group 3 hoops + 2 clubs

Junior Results

Team

Rope 

*In the Qualification, Elena Titova, Aleksandra Zapekina and Alina Maksymenko were placed 7th, so they all advanced into the final.

Hoop

Clubs

Ribbon

References

FIG official site
Full Results (PDF). Archived from the original on April 21, 2018.
Longines Timing

Rhythmic Gymnastics European Championships
Rhythmic Gymnastics European Championships
International gymnastics competitions hosted by Russia
Rhythmic Gymnastics European Championships